Steven W. Langdon (born July 15, 1946) is a Canadian academic, politician, economist, and former parliamentarian.

Born in Stratford, Ontario, Langdon graduated from the University of Trinity College in the University of Toronto in 1969. He also has a doctorate from the University of Sussex.

He ran for the New Democratic Party four times before being elected to the House of Commons from Essex in the 1984 election.

Langdon was re-elected in the 1988 election and stood as a left-wing candidate to succeed Ed Broadbent in the 1989 NDP leadership convention. He finished third behind Audrey McLaughlin, the eventual winner, and Dave Barrett.

He lost his seat in the 1993 election along with all of Ontario's federal NDP MPs.

Since leaving politics, Langdon has worked as an adjunct research professor in the department of economics at Carleton University in Ottawa.

Electoral record

References

External links

1946 births
Living people
Members of the House of Commons of Canada from Ontario
New Democratic Party MPs
University of Toronto alumni
Trinity College (Canada) alumni
People from Stratford, Ontario